Sameliya is a patwar circle and village in ILRC Nimera in Phagi Tehsil in Jaipur district, Rajasthan. Sameliya is also a patwar circle for nearby villages, Chandama Khurd and Mandap.

In Sameliya, there are 164 households with total population of 975 (with 52.72% males and 47.28% females), based on 2011 census. Total area of village is 11.8 km2.  There is one primary school in Sameliya village.

References 

Villages in Jaipur district